Édouard Rouland (born 27 April 1903, date of death unknown) was a French sports shooter. He competed in the 300 m rifle event at the 1948 Summer Olympics.

References

1903 births
Year of death missing
French male sport shooters
Olympic shooters of France
Shooters at the 1948 Summer Olympics
Sportspeople from Oise
20th-century French people